Johannes Gerhardus Celliers (Jan Celliers, also Cilliers, Fraserburg, 21 July 1861 – 9 January 1931) was a Boer general in the Anglo-Boer War (1899-1902) in South Africa.

Youth
Jan Celliers was born in the Karoo, Northern Cape, as a son of Jacob Daniel Celliers (circa 1835 - 1871) and Johanna Elizabeth Blom (Kruger, Fraserburg, circa februari 1837 - Lichtenburg, 11 July 1921). At a young age Celliers migrated to the Transvaal (South African Republic) where he fought in the First Boer War (1880-1881) in the Marico Kommando.

Second Boer War
At the outbreak of the Second Boer War (Anglo-Boer War) in October 1899 he was a police officer at Krugersdorp. In this war Celliers served as a general for the districts of Lichtenburg and Marico. He became renowned for his methods of firing a gun while galloping fast on a horse, as well as silencing British cannons. In early 1902 he surprised with less than 500 soldiers British Colonel Stanley Brenton von Donop and his 1000 troops who fled. In a meeting with Boer commanders on 29 May 1902 at Vereeniging, Celliers' vote was with those who proposed to stop fighting. Subsequently, he was one of the signatories of the Treaty of Vereeniging in Pretoria concluding the war on 31 May 1902.

References

1861 births
1931 deaths
Afrikaner people
Boer generals
People of the First Boer War
South African military personnel
South African police officers
South African Republic military personnel of the Second Boer War